Bakir Izetbegović (born 28 June 1956) is a Bosnian politician who served as the 6th Bosniak member of the Presidency of Bosnia and Herzegovina from 2010 to 2018. He is the current president of the Party of Democratic Action.

Born in Sarajevo in 1956, Izetbegović is the son of the first and only president of the Republic of Bosnia and Herzegovina, Alija Izetbegović. He graduated from the University of Sarajevo in 1981, working afterwards in architectural firms. After serving as director of the Construction Institute of the Sarajevo Canton, Izetbegović entered politics in 2000. At the 2006 general election, he was elected to the national Parliament.

At the 2010 general election, Izetbegović was elected Bosniak member of the Bosnian Presidency. He was re-elected four years later at the 2014 general election. As both Presidency member and president of the Party of Democratic Action (SDA), he took part in many constitutional reform talks for Bosnia and Herzegovina. During his presidency, Bosnia and Herzegovina faced difficulties following the 2014 Southeast Europe floods, as well as having mass riots some months before the floods. Following the 2018 general election, Izetbegović became a member of the national House of Peoples. At the 2022 general election, he once again ran for a seat in the Presidency as a Bosniak member, but was not elected. He served in the House of Peoples until 2023.

A member of the SDA since its founding in 1990, Izetbegović has been a member of the party's Presidency since 2002. Since 2014, he has been serving as the party's president.

Early life and education
Bakir Izetbegović was born in Sarajevo, PR Bosnia and Herzegovina, FPR Yugoslavia on 28 June 1956. He is the son of the first President of independent Bosnia and Herzegovina, Alija Izetbegović and Halida Repovac.

He attended primary school and high school in Sarajevo and graduated from the Faculty of Architecture of the University of Sarajevo in 1981. From 1982 to 1992, Izetbegović worked as a consultant at an architectural consulting firm.

He made big contributions to many social activities – he was a member of the Management Board of FK Sarajevo, a member of the Management Board of KK Bosna Royal and of the Management Board Member of the Muslim Humanitarian Society "Merhamet" and member of the Council of the Islamic Community of Bosnia and Herzegovina.

Early political career
Izetbegović's father groomed him as his personal assistant to be the future Bosniak leader.

From 1991 to 2003, he served as director of the Construction Institute of the Sarajevo Canton. He entered politics in 2000 and after serving in two regional assemblies, was elected to the Parliamentary Assembly of Bosnia and Herzegovina at the 2006 general election.

He became the Deputy Head of his father's Party of Democratic Action (SDA) Caucus in the Assembly of the Sarajevo Canton in 2000, a position he continued to progressively undertake at higher levels – at the Federal House of Representatives from 2002 to 2007, and at the national House of Representatives from 2007 to 2010. He also became the Chairperson of the Delegation of the Parliamentary Assembly of Bosnia and Herzegovina in the Parliamentary Assembly of the Council of Europe.

Izetbegović has been a member of the SDA Presidency since 2002 and a member of the party since its foundation in 1990. In May 2015, he was elected president of the Party of Democratic Action, succeeding Sulejman Tihić.

Presidency (2010–2018)
At the 2010 general election, Izetbegović was elected to the Presidency of Bosnia and Herzegovina as the Bosniak member. He came in first in a field of nine candidates with 35% of the vote. The runner up, Fahrudin Radončić, won 31% of the vote, while incumbent Haris Silajdžić won 25%. The remaining 9% of the votes were split among other candidates.

Domestic policy

In February 2011, Izetbegović attended a panel in New York City, dedicated to the Dayton Agreement, organized by the Clinton Foundation. The panel was also attended by Croatian President Ivo Josipović.

At the 2014 general election, Izetbegović ran for a second term in the Presidency, winning 247,235 votes, 32.8% of the total and being elected for a second time. He was followed by Fahrudin Radončić with 26.7% and Emir Suljagić with 15.1%. Seven other candidates split the remaining 25% of the votes cast. During his campaign for the election, Izetbegović promised that there will be 100,000 new jobs if people voted for him.

In November 2017, he threatened with war if Republika Srpska opted for independence, and at the same time controversially said that Bosnia and Herzegovina should recognize the independence of Kosovo. On 22 November 2017, a discussion was held on the matter on the TV show Globalno of RTV BN.

On 7 October 2018, Šefik Džaferović, a member and vice president of Izetbegović's SDA, won the 2018 general election for the Bosniak membership of the Presidency and succeeded Izetbegović as the 7th Bosniak member of the Presidency of Bosnia and Herzegovina. During his presidency, Izetbegović held the chairmanship of the Presidency four times all together during the period from 2010 to 2018.

Constitutional reform

As “credible efforts” towards the implementation of the Sejdić–Finci ruling remained the outstanding condition for the entry into force of the Stabilisation and Association Agreement, in June 2012, Czech Commissioner Štefan Füle launched a High Level Dialogue on the Accession Process (HLAD) with Bosnia and Herzegovina, tackling both the Sejdić–Finci issue and the need for a coordination mechanism for the country to speak with a single voice in the accession process. Talks were held in June and November 2012, with little success.

In February 2013, the European Commission decided to step up its involvement, with the direct facilitation of talks by Füle, in coordination with the Council of Europe's Secretary-General Thorbjørn Jagland. In March and April 2013, with the support of the Director-General for Enlargement Stefano Sannino, the EU Delegation in Sarajevo facilitated a series of direct talks between party leaders, with no concrete outcome.

During the summer of 2013, Croatian Democratic Union (HDZ BiH) leader Dragan Čović and Izetbegović reached a political agreement on several files, from Mostar to Sejdić–Finci, in parallel to the initiative led by the U.S. Embassy for a constitutional reform of the Federal entity. An agreement on principles on how to solve the Sejdić–Finci issue was signed by political leaders in Brussels on 1 October 2013, but it evaporated right after. Three further rounds of negotiations among political leaders were led together with Štefan Füle, in a castle near Prague in November 2013, and later in Sarajevo in the first months of 2014, also with the presence of the U.S. and the Venice Commission.

Despite high hopes, a solution could not be found, as the HDZ BiH required the absolute arithmetical certainty of being able to occupy the third seat of the Bosnian Presidency – which, given that the Sejdić–Finci ruling was actually about removing ethnic discrimination in the access to the same Presidency, could not be provided by any possible model. Talks were ended on 17 February 2014, while popular protests were ongoing in Sarajevo and in the rest of the country.

Foreign policy

In June 2012, Izetbegović criticized Serbian President Tomislav Nikolić for refusing to recognize the Srebrenica massacre as an act of genocide, saying it was an insult to the survivors. Even before criticizing Nikolić, Izetbegović, alongside the leaders of Croatia, Slovenia, and Macedonia, boycotted Nikolić's presidential inauguration due to his denial of the genocide in Srebrenica and claims about Vukovar, a Croatian city devastated during the Croatian War of Independence. Some time after, Nikolić apologised for crimes committed by any individual in the name of Serbia, and, in particular, for crimes committed in Srebrenica.

In October 2012, alongside other Presidency members, Izetbegović met with United States Secretary of State Hillary Clinton in Sarajevo.

In July 2014, he stated that Gaza "was for many years a target of Israeli attacks" and warned that the world was "becoming used to violence perpetrated by Israel".

On 7 June 2015, Izetbegović met with Pope Francis in Sarajevo, as part of the Popes's 2015 papal visit to Bosnia and Herzegovina.

In early 2017, Izetbegović met Egyptian members of the Muslim Brotherhood in the Building of the Presidency. In one of his last foreign visits as Presidency member, Izetbegović participated at an EPP summit held in Sofia, Bulgaria on 16 May 2018.

Relations with Turkey

Due to strong bonds between the Bosnian region and the Ottoman Empire since the Ottoman conquest of the Balkans historically, a significant Turkish community as well as ties linking Bosnia and Turkey were established when Bosnia and Herzegovina fell under Ottoman rule.

In 2016, as part of a state project named "living languages and accents in Turkey", the Turkish government accepted the Bosnian language as a selective course for its schools and announced that classes would start in 2018, first being piloted in areas with people of Balkan origins such as the İzmir region.

In May 2018, Izetbegović said, some days before the visit of Turkish President Recep Tayyip Erdoğan in Bosnia and Herzegovina, that "Erdoğan is a mentor for the Muslims and this is the reason that the West doesn't like him."

The Turkish government has also assisted in the reconstruction of historic mosques which were destroyed during the Bosnian War, such as the Aladža Mosque in Foča and the Arnaudija Mosque in Banja Luka.

Post-presidency (2018–present)
Shortly after having to leave the Presidency, due to the term limit of eight years, in February 2019, Izetbegović became a member of the national House of Peoples. On 28 February, he became the new chairman of the House of Peoples. He served as member of the House of Peoples until 16 February 2023.

Izetbegović announced his candidacy in the Bosnian general election on 30 June 2022, running once again for Presidency member, representing the Bosniaks. At the general election however, held on 2 October 2022, he was not elected, obtaining 37.25% of the vote, with Social Democratic Party candidate Denis Bećirović getting elected with 57.37% of the vote.

Controversies

Dževad Galijašević, a member of the Southeast European Expert Team for the Fight against Terrorism and Organized Crime, accused Izetbegović in 2011 of supporting and helping Wahhabis in Bosnia and Herzegovina.

In May 2018, Izetbegović allegedly said that Croats and Serbs "are fictional nations" and that "before, no one in Bosnia was called anything other than a Bošnjanin", continuing stating "Croats and Serbs originated from Bosniaks."

In October 2019, while most of the world condemned it, Izetbegović supported the Turkish offensive into north-eastern Syria, saying "Turkey has the right to defend its security, territorial integrity and resolve the refugee issue."

In May 2020, he was accused of being "an advocate of Sharia in Bosnia and Herzegovina", a religious law forming part of the Islamic tradition.

In July 2021, Izetbegović called Croatian President Zoran Milanović "arrogant" and said "Croatians will suffer because of his actions." This statement came after Milanović said that the "Croats in Bosnia and Herzegovina are being robbed, that will come to an end!"

Personal life
Izetbegović has been married to Sebija Građević since 1983, and together they have a daughter named Jasmina. They live in Sarajevo. His wife is the managing director of KCUS - Klinički Centar Univerziteta Sarajevo (English: University of Sarajevo Clinical Center).

On 16 October 2020, it was confirmed that Izetbegović tested positive for COVID-19, amid the pandemic in Bosnia and Herzegovina. On 26 May 2021, he received his first dose of the Pfizer–BioNTech COVID-19 vaccine.

On 27 August 2021, Izetbegović's daughter Jasmina got married in Sarajevo, and at the wedding, Turkish President Recep Tayyip Erdoğan, who was on a state visit in Bosnia and Herzegovina, was present in a role of a godfather.

See also
Politics of Bosnia and Herzegovina

References

External links

Bakir Izetbegović at imovinapoliticara.cin.ba

1956 births
Living people
Politicians from Sarajevo
Bosnia and Herzegovina Muslims
Bosniaks of Bosnia and Herzegovina
Bosnia and Herzegovina people of Turkish descent
Children of national leaders
University of Sarajevo alumni
Party of Democratic Action politicians
Members of the House of Representatives (Bosnia and Herzegovina)
Members of the Presidency of Bosnia and Herzegovina
Chairmen of the Presidency of Bosnia and Herzegovina
Members of the House of Peoples of Bosnia and Herzegovina
Chairmen of the House of Peoples of Bosnia and Herzegovina